The Laguna Pueblo (Western Keres: Kawaika [kʰɑwɑjkʰɑ]) is a federally recognized tribe of Native American Pueblo people in west-central New Mexico, near the city of Albuquerque, in the United States. Part of the Laguna territory is included in the Albuquerque metropolitan area, chiefly around Laguna's Route 66 Resort and Casino. The name, Laguna, is Spanish (meaning "small lake") and derives from the lake on their reservation. This body of water was formed by an ancient dam that was constructed by the Laguna people. After the Pueblo Revolt of 1680–1696, the Mission San José de la Laguna was erected by the Spanish at the old pueblo (now Old Laguna) and finished around July 4, 1699.

Geography

Their reservation lies in parts of four counties: In descending order of included land area they are Cibola, Sandoval, Valencia and Bernalillo Counties. It includes the six villages of Encinal, Laguna, Mesita, Paguate, Paraje, and Seama.

The Laguna Pueblo (and the Acoma Pueblo) lie in the river basin of the Rio San Jose. The laguna or lake was historically much larger than the present time and hosted waterfowl of many kinds, including ducks, geese and swans. The Rio San Jose flows into the Rio Puerco near the southeast corner of the Laguna Reservation.

Communities

Encinal
Laguna
New Laguna, New Mexico
Mesita
Paguate
Paraje
Seama
Casa Blanca, New Mexico

Demographics 
On the 2010 census 6,758 people in the U.S. reported being exclusively Laguna and 8,358 people reported being Laguna either exclusively or in combination with another group.

The State of New Mexico says the population is 7,700.

History 

The people of Laguna have a long history of residing in and farming along the Rio San José in west-central New Mexico. Laguna history begins long before the advent of written records in the Southwest. It is a common misconception that the Pueblo of Laguna began in 1699, at the time of the construction of the Mission. However, research of 1,449 archaeological sites and an anthropological analysis of the Laguna oral history have firmly proven that people have inhabited the area ranging from 6500 B.C. to the present.

The Acoma Pueblo and Pueblo of Laguna have many ties, including location, language and a shared high school.

The Pueblo of Laguna has a well-established Tribal Law system. The Pueblo of Laguna has participated as a "Weed and Seed" tribe. This Department of Justice program studied the enforcement of law and effectiveness of social programs on Native American lands.

The Irish surname Riley was adopted by many members of the Laguna tribe in the 1800s, for legal use in European-American culture, while they retained their Laguna names for tribal use.

Education
Primary and middle school education is provided by the Laguna Department of Education, which also operates Early Childhood program and adult education programs. The high school is shared with nearby Acoma Pueblo. Lagunas value intellectual activity and education, so a scholarship program has led to many well-educated Lagunas. Uranium mining on Pueblo of Laguna land has contributed to this scholarship program as well as to skilled labor learning among Laguna members. Lagunas and other Pueblos enjoy baseball. Like many Pueblos, the Laguna people are skilled in pottery.

Language

Lagunas traditionally speak the Western variety of Keresan. Most Laguna elders do not speak English.

Economy
The Laguna Development Corporation; founded in 1998, is a wholly owned subsidiary of the Pueblo of Laguna. Laguna Development is a federally chartered tribal corporation formed under Section 17 of the 1934 Indian Reorganization Act.

The company develops and operates the tribe's retail-based outlets, including two travel centers, a supermarket, a convenience store, an RV park, an arcade, a Superette and three casinos on the Pueblo of Laguna reservation that spans Cibola, Bernalillo, Valencia and Sandoval counties.

Laguna Construction Company, a construction company owned by the Pueblo of Laguna, was one of the largest U.S. contractors in Iraq, with reconstruction contracts worth more than $300 million since 2004. In addition to its headquarters at the pueblo, Laguna Industries, Inc. maintains offices in Albuquerque, New Mexico; San Antonio and Houston, Texas; Baghdad, Iraq, and Amman, Jordan. In 2007, Laguna Construction employed 75 people, most of whom belong to the pueblo.

Several Laguna Pueblo businesses are along tourist and truck route corridors that attract New Mexico tourists, long- and short-haul truck drivers, and residents of nearby Albuquerque. Other Laguna Development businesses provide basic services to local tribal communities.

Notable People

Paula Gunn Allen (1939–2008), author, novelist, and scholar
Deb Haaland, 54th U.S Secretary of the Interior, the first Native American to lead a cabinet-level agency. She was former U.S. Representative for New Mexico's 1st congressional district (2019–2021), former chair of the Democratic Party of New Mexico (2015–2017), and nominee for lieutenant governor in 2014.
Frank Hudson (1875–1950), football player, coach
Michael Kanteena, potter
Lee Marmon, photographer
Leslie Marmon Silko, author

See also

Anaconda, New Mexico
Anton Docher "The Padre of Isleta"
National Register of Historic Places listings in Cibola County, New Mexico

Notes

References
 Pritzker, Barry M. A Native American Encyclopedia: History, Culture, and Peoples. Oxford: Oxford University Press, 2000. .
Laguna Pueblo and Off-Reservation Trust Land, New Mexico United States Census Bureau
Notable Native Americans

External links

Official Pueblo of Laguna website
Pueblo of Laguna Website
Laguna Public Library
Library of Congress: Laguna Pueblo gallery – historic photographs of Pueblo of Laguna.
HABS: San Jose de la Laguna Mission Church & Convento gallery – historic photos from the federal HABS—Historic American Buildings Survey project.

 
Puebloan peoples
Pueblo great houses
Native American tribes in New Mexico
Federally recognized tribes in the United States
History of Cibola County, New Mexico
Native American history of New Mexico
Populated places in Bernalillo County, New Mexico
Populated places in Cibola County, New Mexico
Populated places in Sandoval County, New Mexico
Populated places in Valencia County, New Mexico
Historic districts on the National Register of Historic Places in New Mexico
National Register of Historic Places in Cibola County, New Mexico
Pueblos on the National Register of Historic Places in New Mexico